Kovačica  is a village in the municipality of Tuzla, Tuzla Canton, Bosnia and Herzegovina.

Demographics 
According to the 2013 census, its population was 46.

References

External links 
 Tuzla official site

Populated places in Tuzla